Sainthal is a town and a nagar panchayat in Dausa district in the Indian state of Rajasthan. Sainthal is 24 kilometres from Dausa city.

Demographics
 India census, Sainthal had a population of 11,000. Males constitute 52% of the population and females 48%.  In Sainthal, 18% of the population is under 6 years of age.

References

Cities and towns in Dausa district